The Union of Marxist–Leninist Communists of Belgium was a minor Communist party in Belgium, having existed during 1970–1976.

References

Defunct communist parties in Belgium